John Lysander Gretton, 4th Baron Gretton (born 17 April 1975), is an English peer, landowner and farmer.

Lord Gretton was born in 1975, the only son of John Gretton, later 3rd Baron, and his wife Jennifer Ann (née Moore), later Lady Gretton. He was educated at Shrewsbury School and RAC Cirencester. He succeeded his father as Baron Gretton on his father's death in 1989, whilst still farming at Somerby House, Leicestershire. The House of Lords Act 1999 removed the right of hereditary peers to sit in the House of Lords; so far Baron Gretton has not been one of the peers elected to be excepted from this either in the initial elections or any subsequent by elections.

Arms

References

 'GRETTON’, Who's Who 2013, A & C Black, an imprint of Bloomsbury Publishing plc, 2013; online edn, Oxford University Press, Dec 2012; online edn, Nov 2012 accessed 11 Feb 2013

Barons in the Peerage of the United Kingdom
Living people
1975 births
People from Leicestershire
Gretton